Events from the year 1516 in art.

Events
 Leonardo da Vinci moves to France and enters the service of King Francis I of France, being given the use of the manor house Clos Lucé connected via tunnel to the king's residence at the Château d'Amboise. He probably brings the Mona Lisa with him.

Works

 Fra Bartolomeo
 Pietà
 Scene with Christ in the Temple
 Hieronymus Bosch – Christ Carrying the Cross
 Cima da Conegliano
 St Lanfranc enthroned between St John the Baptist and St Liberius
 St Peter Enthroned with St John the Baptist and St Paul (Pinacoteca di Brera, Milan)
 Innocenzo di Pietro Francucci da Imola – The Virgin and Child with Saints John, Apollinaris and Catherine and a Bishop
 Leonardo da Vinci – St. John the Baptist
 Matthias Grünewald – Isenheim Altarpiece (completed, with sculptures by Nikolaus Hagenauer)
 Lorenzo Lotto – Martinengo Altarpiece (Church of Santi Bartolomeo e Stefano, Bergamo)
 Michelangelo – Dying Slave (marble)
 Pontormo
 Madonna with Child and Saints (approximate date)
 Visitation of the Virgin and St Elizabeth (fresco in Santissima Annunziata, Florence, completed)
 Raphael
 Cartoons of scenes from the Gospels and Acts of the Apostles for tapestries for the Sistine Chapel (Victoria and Albert Museum, London)
 Portrait of Cardinal Bibbiena
 Portrait of Andrea Navagero and Agostino Beazzano
 Titian – The Tribute Money

Births
February 16 - Prospero Spani, Italian sculptor (died 1584)
date unknown
 Antonio Bernieri, Italian painter (died 1565) 
 Cristóvão Lopes, Portuguese portrait and altarpiece painter (died 1594)
 Domenico Riccio, Italian painter in a Mannerist style from Verona (died 1567)

Deaths
June 1 - Biagio d'Antonio, Italian painter (born 1446)
August 9 (bur.) – Hieronymus Bosch, Early Netherlandish painter of the 15th and 16th centuries (born c.1450)
c. November 26? - Giovanni Bellini, Venetian Renaissance painter (born c.1430)
date unknown
 Giuliano da Sangallo, Florentine sculptor and architect (born c.1443)
 Jacopo de' Barbari, Italian painter and printmaker (born 1440)
 Antonio del Massaro, Italian Quattrocento painters (born c. 1450)
 Giovanni Antonio Boltraffio, Italian painter of the High Renaissance who worked in the studio of Leonardo da Vinci (born 1466/1467)
 Antonio Lombardo, Italian sculptor (born 1458)

 
Years of the 16th century in art